Beta C can refer to:

Beta C-Mag, a NATO-standard magazine for rifles and submachine guns.
Titanium Beta C, a titanium alloy